Lucky Tonight

"Lucky Tonight", song by Dannii Minogue from Get into You 
"Lucky Tonight", song by John Pardi from California Sunrise
"Lucky Tonight", song by Dwarves from Thank Heaven for Little Girls (album)